Phillip Chorba is an actor who has played roles in films such as Silver Linings Playbook and Concussion; television shows such as The Knick, Broad City, and Blue Bloods;  and also frequently appears in television commercials.  In Silver Linings Playbook, he played the role of Jennifer Lawrence's ex-boyfriend Jordie.  Chorba also had a role in the psychological thriller The Red.

Early life and education 
Born in New York City and raised in Allendale, New Jersey, Chorba graduated from Saint Joseph Regional High School in Montvale, New Jersey before majoring in theatre at Union College, where he graduated in 2005. He initially contemplated pursuing a career in football, but turned his focus to acting after being sidelined for a season (in college) because of an injury. After college, Chorba studied for three years at the Upright Citizens Brigade Theatre, an improvisational theater and training center in Manhattan.

Chorba is of half Italian and half Hungarian descent.

Personal life 
Chorba married his high-school sweetheart in 2008.  They reside in Seneca County, NY and have a son and a daughter.

References

External links 
 
 

Union College (New York) alumni
Saint Joseph Regional High School alumni
Living people
Male actors from New Jersey
People from Allendale, New Jersey
People from Astoria, Queens
Year of birth missing (living people)
Male actors from New York City